El Roble is a district of the Puntarenas canton, in the Puntarenas province of Costa Rica.

History 
El Roble was created on 14 September 1999 by Ley 7909.

Geography 
El Roble has an area of  km² and an elevation of  metres.

Demographics 

For the 2011 census, El Roble had a population of  inhabitants.

Transportation

Road transportation 
The district is covered by the following road routes:
 National Route 17
 National Route 23

References 

Districts of Puntarenas Province
Populated places in Puntarenas Province